The Eski Mosque (from , "Old Mosque") is a mosque in the Greek town of Komotini dating back to 1608, or 1677/88, based on an inscription. Despite its name, the Eski Mosque was built after the Yeni ("New") Mosque of 1585, but it is likely that an original mosque stood at that place, dating back to the time of the Ottoman conquest of the area under Evrenos. According to the 1892 Ottoman salname, the mosque featured an inscription in a "non-Ottoman" language, hence it is possible that the mosque was built on the site of a former Byzantine church.

In the 1910s, the Bulgarians turned the mosque into a church and destroyed part of the minaret (up to the Sherefe). The building was returned to the Moslem minority in 1919-20, under the French administration of Komotini. By then, the demolished minaret and the current 2 balconies were rebuilt.

Sources 
 

Buildings and structures in Komotini
Ottoman mosques in Greece
17th-century mosques